Hehlenriede is a river of Lower Saxony, Germany. It flows into the Aller Canal near Gifhorn.

See also
List of rivers of Lower Saxony

Rivers of Lower Saxony
Rivers of Germany